PTV Home HD is a Pakistani free-to-air television channel owned by the Pakistan Television Corporation. It also broadcast as a Terrestrial television.

Current programming

References

External links
 Pakistan Television (PTV) official PTV Home website, Retrieved 8 June 2016

Television stations in Islamabad
Television channels and stations established in 1964
Publicly funded broadcasters
Multilingual broadcasters
Public broadcasting in Pakistan